Bubsy in: Fractured Furry Tales is a 1994 platform video game developed by Imagitec Design and published by Atari Corporation for the Atari Jaguar. It is the third entry in the Bubsy series, preceding Bubsy 2. The title itself is a word play in reference to Fractured Fairy Tales, a recurring segment from the animated television series The Adventures of Rocky and Bullwinkle and Friends. The plot follows Bubsy, the series' titular character, who ventures through Fairytaleland to restore order and protect children all over the world from creatures and antagonists of corrupted fairy tales, which appeared after Mother Goose was captured by Hansel and Gretel.

In 1993, Accolade signed an agreement with Atari to become a third-party developer for the Jaguar, licensing Bubsy in: Claws Encounters of the Furred Kind from their catalog to be ported and released on the platform. During development, it was decided to create an original title due to Claws Encounters of the Furred Kind being already old on the market, introducing new enemies and storyline while making it more difficult than previous entries to cater towards younger and older players, using the original source code ported from Sega Genesis as basis. Fractured Furry Tales was produced by Faran Thomason, who worked on Jaguar titles such as Cybermorph (1993).

Bubsy in: Fractured Furry Tales garnered mixed reception from critics and retrospective commentarists; some reviewers were divided regarding the overall audiovisual presentation, which they felt did not make use of the Jaguar's hardware and compared it to previous iterations on Genesis and Super Nintendo Entertainment System, while criticism was geared towards its gameplay, controls, level design, and high difficulty. By 1995, the game had sold less than 9,000 copies. It was followed by Bubsy 3D (1996).

Gameplay 

Bubsy in: Fractured Furry Tales is a side-scrolling platform game similar to Bubsy in: Claws Encounters of the Furred Kind and Bubsy 2 in which the player assume the role of Bubsy, an anthropomorphic orange bobcat and the game's protagonist. The plot follows Bubsy venturing through Fairytaleland to restore order and protect children all over the world from creatures and antagonists of corrupted fairy tales that appeared after Mother Goose, who maintained peace and balance of the stories on Fairytaleland, was captured by Hansel and Gretel. The player controls Bubsy across 15 levels divided into three chapters, each themed after five fairy tales: Alice's Adventures in Wonderland, Jack and the Beanstalk, Ali Baba and the Forty Thieves, Twenty Thousand Leagues Under the Sea, and Hansel and Gretel.

The player must maneuver Bubsy through the levels by jumping and gliding, while also collecting "Bubsy Balls" scattered across the levels, which grant points and an extra life when 500 balls are collected. Players start off with nine lives at the beginning of the game, which are lost if Bubsy comes into contact with an enemy or an enemy attack, falls into either a spiked pit, a body of water or from heights without gliding, gets crushed, or running out of time. More lives can be earned by collecting numbered t-shirts but the game is over once all lives are lost, though the player can keep playing from the last level they died by finding a continue item. While it has a password feature that allows the player to resume their last progress, the game's internal EEPROM only saves high scores and changes to the option settings. In addition, the game also has a two-player option which allows two players to play tby alternating turns.

Bubsy can only take one hit before losing a life, instead of three hits as in Bubsy 2. Another omission from the second game is the Nerf gun, leaving Bubsy without any other defense means against enemies and bosses. Enemies and bosses in the game are themed after their respective levels, representing one of the five fairy tales and enemies do not respawn on the level when defeated, even after the player loses a life. Unlike the second game, stage progression in Fractured Furry Tales is instead linear. Other returning elements from Claws Encounters of the Furred Kind are crates containing beneficial or harmful objects, invincibility t-shirts that render Bubsy immune to enemy contact and attacks but not from environmental hazards, checkpoints that let players restart at the last location reached after dying, among others. New to the series are signal light posts placed at a fixed position on the level, acting as switches to deactivate spiked doors that block a section of the level if they are colored red. The door opens when the post is colored green the doors open, allowing players to progress further through the level. Also returning from both the first and second entries are doors which warps Bubsy into another section of the level or a hidden room.

Development and release 
Bubsy in: Fractured Furry Tales was created by Imagitec Design, a Dewsbury-based game developer founded in 1986, which had previously developed The Humans (1992) and a conversion of Raiden (1990) for the Atari Jaguar. It was produced by Faran Thomason of Atari Corporation, who worked on Jaguar titles such as Cybermorph (1993). The coding work was chiefly handled by programmer Andrew Seed, with Karl West, Martin Randall, Nigel Conroy, and Trevor Raynsford providing additional support. The game was designed by Jody Cobb, who also acted as level designer alongside Mark Hooley, with Seed as well as David Severn and Steve Noake providing additional design. Severn and Noake, along with Colin Jackson and Rick Lodge, were also responsible for the artwork. Game artist Shaun McClure also collaborated in the development process at Imagitec, drawing some of the game's enemies but went uncredited. The soundtrack was composed by Alastair Lindsay and Kevin Saville. Thomason recounted the project's creation and history in interviews.

In 1993, Accolade signed an agreement with Atari to become a third-party developer for the Jaguar, licensing five titles from their catalog in order to be ported and released on the platform: Barkley Shut Up and Jam!, Brett Hull Hockey, Bubsy in: Claws Encounters of the Furred Kind, HardBall III, and Jack Nicklaus' Power Challenge Golf. The original idea was to port Claws Encounters of the Furred Kind to Jaguar, with gaming magazines advertising it as such. According to Thomason, however, it was decided to make an original title during development due to the first game being already old on the market, introducing new enemies and storyline while using the original source code ported from Sega Genesis supplied by Accolade as basis. The game was also made more difficult than previous Bubsy entries to cater towards younger and older players, with Thomason explaining that this was due to playtesters who were used to the extreme difficulty of video games at the time. Thomason also claimed the game's marketing and production budget was "fairly limited".

The game was first showcased at the 1994 Summer Consumer Electronics Show. Its final title, Bubsy in: Fractured Furry Tales, was later unveiled and featured in a promotional recording sent by Atari to video game retail stores on November 14, being advertised with a December 1994 launch window. It was first released in North America on December 9, and later in Europe on January 1995. It was also distributed in Japan by retailer Messe Sanoh. Fractured Furry Tales was the only game out of the five titles from the Atari-Accolade deal to be released for Jaguar.

Reception 

Bubsy in: Fractured Furry Tales garnered mixed reception from critics. Internal documentation from Atari Corporation showed that the game had sold less than 9,000 copies by April 1, 1995, though the book Inside Electronic Game Design by author Arnie Katz tells that 50,000 out of only 60,000 copies produced were sold in the first six months of release. 

GamePros Manny LaMancha commented that "Bubsy offers a muddled mix of good and bad ingredients", citing colorful graphics but jerky animation, good music but raspy sound effects, inconsistent control responsiveness, and fickle collision detection. Mega Funs Martin Weidner noted its level design and extensive worlds but concurred with LaMachna, finding Bubsy's controls sloppy and the collision detection imprecise, as well as the game's high difficulty frustrating. Player Ones Sami Souibgui commended the visuals and humor but criticized its playability, particularly Bubsy's controls. Souibgui ultimately regarded it as "A nice platform game, then, but which like too many Jaguar games does not exploit the capabilities of this console." 

Writing for the German magazine Jaguar, Daniel Jaeckel gave it positive remarks for the graphics but echoed similar thoughts as LaMancha and Weidner regarding the controls and difficulty, in addition of finding each chapter frustrating due to their non-linear level design and numerous enemies. Consoles + lauded its visuals and varied action, but they felt that the gameplay was not up to par. Electronic Gaming Monthlys five reviewers felt that the game's control could have been tweaked. Nevertheless, they highlighted its large levels, as well as the detailed graphics and sound, commenting that "Bubsy fans will love this version of the popular character, and this one will prove challenging to even the most hardened veterans of the series." In contrast, Game Players wrote: "To call this game frustrating is to give frustrating games a bad name. It just goes to show you that some endangered species deserve to be extinct."

MAN!ACs Robert Bannert saw the game's world visually unimaginative, expressing that it did not showcased the Jaguar's hardware. Next Generation said it has colorful and visually pleasing graphics but generic gameplay, and concluded: "Not a bad title, but platform fans will probably find Zool 2 a little more entertaining and a lot more innovative." Play Times Stephan Girlich regarded it as an "average fare", noting that its high level of difficulty quickly "killed" interest. An editor of German publication ST-Computer did not concurred with the other critics regarding the game's visuals, commending its appealing fairy tale world, colorful backgrounds, and Bubsy's detailed animation. However, the editor found its poor audio quality and difficulty to be negative aspects. 

Marc Abramson of the French ST Magazine found Fractured Furry Tales fast and fluid but neither difficult nor easy. Abramson also commended the colorful and "pretty" cartoon-like setting, though he felt that it didn't pushed the Jaguar's hardware. VideoGames Jim Loftus disagreed and lambasted the game's overall graphical presentation, writing that it did not showed signs of being a "true" 64-bit title. Loftus also criticized the frustrating gameplay, lack of original play mechanics, and audio department. Fluxs Jeff Kitts wrote that "the Jag's huge color palette and graphic capabilities gives Bubsy an impressively rich look. However, the action is way, way slow and at times so jerky you'll feel like your Jag is on the fritz." Atari Gaming Headquarters Keita Iida was equally critical of the game, citing a frustrating combination of sloppy controls and high difficulty, suggesting Jaguar owners Rayman (1995) instead due to balanced gameplay, modest difficulty level, and better audiovisual presentation.

Retrospective coverage 
Retrospective commentary for Bubsy in: Fractured Furry Tales has been equally middling. Author Andy Slaven regarded it as one of the better platform games on the Jaguar, citing its controls and colorful graphics, though noting that it looked and played exactly like the Super NES and Sega Genesis iterations. In a retrospective review, The Atari Times Christopher J. Bean criticized the animation and control, though he complimented the visuals and music. In a retrospective outlook of the Bubsy series, IGNs Levi Buchanan wrote that while the fairy tale theme worked, the game's attitude felt very forced, the extras and improvements from Bubsy 2 had been dropped, and that the game overall felt like "one giant step sideways". Michael Tausendpfund of German website neXGam faulted its demanding difficulty and long levels. Although Tausendpfund gave positive remarks for its adequate gameplay and fluid graphics, he felt that the game was technically feasible on SNES. Hardcore Gaming 101s Kurt Kalata found its concept interesting and the visuals impressive by SNES standards. While also commending the Amiga-style music, Kalata nevertheless wrote that "you can expect the same crappiness as it's predecessor."

References

External links 

 Bubsy in: Fractured Furry Tales at AtariAge
 Bubsy in: Fractured Furry Tales at GameFAQs
 Bubsy in: Fractured Furry Tales at Giant Bomb
 Bubsy in: Fractured Furry Tales at MobyGames

1994 video games
Atari games
Atari Jaguar games
Atari Jaguar-only games
Bubsy
Imagitec Design games
Multiplayer and single-player video games
Platform games
Side-scrolling platform games
Video games developed in the United Kingdom
Video games scored by Alastair Lindsay
Video games scored by Kevin Saville